Qoli Laleh-ye Sofla (also Romanized as Qolī Lāleh-ye Sofla; also known as Gol Lāleh, Qolī Lāleh, Qolī Lāleh-ye Pā’īn, and Quli Lāleh) is a village in Qolqol Rud Rural District, Qolqol Rud District, Tuyserkan County, Hamadan Province, Iran. At the 2006 census, its population was 403, in 94 families.

References 

Populated places in Tuyserkan County